The 1881 United States Senate election in Pennsylvania was held on thirty separate dates from January to February 1881. On February 23, 1881, John I. Mitchell was elected by the Pennsylvania General Assembly to the United States Senate.

Results
The Pennsylvania General Assembly, consisting of the House of Representatives and the Senate, convened on January 27, 1881, to elect a Senator to serve the term beginning on March 4, 1881. Thirty-five ballots were recorded on thirty separate dates spanning from January 27 to February 23, 1881. The results of the thirty-fifth and final ballot of both houses combined are as follows:

|-
|-bgcolor="#EEEEEE"
| colspan="3" align="right" | Totals
| align="right" | 251
| align="right" | 100.00%
|}

See also 
 United States Senate elections, 1880 and 1881

References

External links
Pennsylvania Election Statistics: 1682-2006 from the Wilkes University Election Statistics Project

1881
Pennsylvania
United States Senate